Arthur Andersen was an American accounting firm based in Chicago that provided auditing, tax advising, consulting and other professional services to large corporations. By 2001, it had become one of the world's largest multinational corporations and was one of the "Big Five" accounting firms (along with Deloitte & Touche, Ernst & Young, KPMG and PricewaterhouseCoopers). The firm collapsed by mid-2002, as details of its questionable accounting practices for energy company Enron and telecommunications company Worldcom were revealed amid the two high-profile bankruptcies. The scandals were a factor in the enactment of the Sarbanes-Oxley Act of 2002.

In 2002, just nine months after the scandal broke, the firm was found guilty of crimes in the auditing of Enron. By that time, Arthur Andersen had lost most of its business and two-thirds of its 28,000 employees, and was facing multi-million dollar lawsuits. On August 31, 2002, the company surrendered its licenses to practice as certified public accountants in the United States, effectively putting the company out of business. In 2005, the United States Supreme Court unanimously reversed Arthur Andersen's conviction due to errors in the trial judge's instructions to the jury that convicted the firm. Despite this, the damage to Andersen's reputation was so great that it has never returned as a viable auditor even on a limited scale.

, some parts of the company continue to exist: the company's consulting services have been split out and continue today as Accenture and Protiviti, while some of the former partners formed a new firm in 2002 focused on tax services, now called Andersen Tax.

History

Founding 

Born May 30, 1885, in Plano, Illinois, and orphaned at the age of 16, Arthur E. Andersen began working as a mail boy by day and attended school at night, eventually being hired as the assistant to the comptroller of Allis-Chalmers in Chicago. In 1908, after attending courses at night while working full-time, he graduated from the Kellogg School of Management at Northwestern University with a bachelor's degree in business. That same year, at age 23, he became the youngest Certified Public Accountant in Illinois.

In 1913, Andersen and Clarence DeLany founded an accounting firm as Andersen, DeLany & Co. The firm changed its name to Arthur Andersen & Co. in 1918. Arthur Andersen's first client was the Joseph Schlitz Brewing Company of Milwaukee. In 1915, due to his many contacts there, the Milwaukee office was opened as the firm's second office.

Andersen believed education was the basis upon which the new profession of accounting should be developed. He created the profession's first centralized training program and believed in training during normal working hours. He was generous in his commitment to aiding educational, civic and charitable organizations. In 1927, he was elected to the board of trustees of Northwestern University and served as its president from 1930 to 1932. He was also chairman of the board of CPA examiners of Illinois.

Reputation 
Andersen, who headed the firm until his death in 1947, was a zealous supporter of high standards in the accounting industry. A stickler for honesty, he argued that accountants' responsibility was to investors, not their clients' management. This gave rise to the uniform look of all the so-called "Arthur Androids", as employees referred to themselves, the intent being to provide the same service the same way to all customers in all locations. For many years, Andersen's motto was "Think straight, talk straight"—an axiom passed on from his mother. During the early years, it is reputed that Andersen was approached by an executive from a local rail utility to sign off on accounts containing flawed accounting, or else face the loss of a major client. Andersen refused in no uncertain terms, replying that there was "not enough money in the city of Chicago" to make him do it. The railroad fired Andersen, only to go bankrupt a few months later.

Arthur Andersen also led the way in a number of areas of accounting standards. Being among the first to identify a possible sub-prime bust, Arthur Andersen dissociated itself from a number of clients in the 1970s. Later, with the emergence of stock options as a form of compensation, Arthur Andersen was the first of the major accountancy firms to propose to the Financial Accounting Standards Board that employee stock options should be treated as an expense, thus impacting net profit just as cash compensation would.

By the 1980s, standards throughout the industry fell as accountancy firms struggled to balance their commitment to audit independence against the desire to grow their burgeoning consultancy practices. Having established a reputation for IT consultancy in the 1980s, Arthur Andersen was no exception. The firm rapidly expanded its consultancy practice to the point where the bulk of its revenues was derived from such engagements, while audit partners were continually encouraged to seek out opportunities for consulting fees from existing audit clients. By the late-1990s, Arthur Andersen had succeeded in tripling the per-share revenues of its partners.

Arthur Andersen struggled to balance the need to maintain its faithfulness to accounting standards with its clients' desire to maximize profits, particularly in the era of quarterly earnings reports. The firm has been alleged to have been involved in the fraudulent accounting and auditing of Sunbeam Products, Waste Management, Asia Pulp & Paper, the Baptist Foundation of Arizona, WorldCom, as well as Enron, among others.

Andersen Consulting and Accenture 
The consulting wing of the firm became increasingly important during the 1970s and 1980s, growing at a much faster rate than the more established accounting, auditing, and tax practice. This disproportionate growth, and the consulting division partners' belief that they were not garnering their fair share of firm profits, created increasing friction between the two divisions.

In 1989, Arthur Andersen and Andersen Consulting became separate units of Andersen Worldwide Société Coopérative. Arthur Andersen increased its use of accounting services as a springboard to sign up clients for Andersen Consulting's more lucrative business.

The two businesses spent most of the 1990s in a bitter dispute. Andersen Consulting saw a huge surge in profits during the decade. The consultants, however, continued to resent transfer payments they were required to make to Arthur Andersen. In August 2000, at the conclusion of International Chamber of Commerce arbitration of the dispute, the arbitrators granted Andersen Consulting its independence from Arthur Andersen, but awarded $1.2 billion in past payments (held in escrow pending the ruling) to Arthur Andersen, and declared that Andersen Consulting could no longer use the Andersen name. As a result, Andersen Consulting changed its name to Accenture on January 1, 2001, and Arthur Andersen, having the right to the Andersen Consulting name, rebranded itself as "Andersen".

Four hours after the arbitrator made his ruling, Arthur Andersen CEO Jim Wadia resigned. Industry analysts and business school professors alike viewed the event as a complete victory for Andersen Consulting. Wadia would provide insight on his resignation years later at a Harvard Business school case activity about the split. It turned out that the Arthur Andersen board passed a resolution saying he had to resign if he did not get at least an incremental $4 billion (either through negotiation or via the arbitrator decision) for the consulting practice to split off, hence his quick resignation once the decision was announced.

Accounts vary on why the split occurred—executives on both sides of the split cite greed and arrogance on the part of the other side. The executives on the Andersen Consulting side maintained it was a breach of contract when Arthur Andersen created a second consulting group, AABC (Arthur Andersen Business Consulting) which competed directly with Andersen Consulting in the marketplace. AABC grew quickly, most notably its healthcare and technology practices. Many of the AABC firms were bought out by other consulting companies in 2002, most notably, Deloitte (especially in Europe), Hitachi Consulting, PwC Consulting, which was later acquired by IBM, and KPMG Consulting, which later changed its name to BearingPoint. In addition, several former Andersen partners formed new companies, notably Huron Consulting Group, West Monroe Partners, and Protiviti.

Enron scandal 

Following the 2001 scandal in which energy giant Enron was found to have fraudulently reported $100 billion in revenue through institutional and systematic accounting fraud, Andersen's performance and alleged complicity as an auditor came under intense scrutiny. The Powers Committee (appointed by Enron's board to look into the firm's accounting in October 2001) came to the following assessment: "The evidence available to us suggests that Andersen did not fulfill its professional responsibilities in connection with its audits of Enron's financial statements, or its obligation to bring to the attention of Enron's Board (or the Audit and Compliance Committee) concerns about Enron's internal contracts over the related-party transactions".

On June 15, 2002, Andersen was convicted of obstruction of justice for shredding documents related to its audit of Enron. Although the Supreme Court reversed the firm's conviction, the impact of the scandal combined with the findings of criminal complicity ultimately destroyed the firm. Nancy Temple (in the firm's legal department) and David Duncan (lead partner for the Enron account) were cited as the responsible managers in the scandal because they ordered subordinates to shred relevant documents.

Because the U.S. Securities and Exchange Commission will not accept audits from convicted felons, the firm agreed to surrender its CPA licenses and its right to practice before the SEC on August 31, 2002—effectively putting the firm out of business. It had already started winding down its American operations after the indictment, and many of its accountants joined other firms. The firm sold most of its American operations to KPMG, Deloitte & Touche, Ernst & Young and Grant Thornton LLP. The damage to Andersen's reputation also destroyed the firm's international practices. Most of them were taken over by the local firms of the other major international accounting firms.

The indictment also put a spotlight on the firm's faulty audits of other companies, most notably Waste Management, Sunbeam Products, the Baptist Foundation of Arizona and WorldCom. The subsequent bankruptcy of WorldCom, which quickly surpassed Enron as the biggest bankruptcy in history (and has since been passed by the bankruptcies of Lehman Brothers and Washington Mutual in the financial crisis of 2007–2008) led to a domino effect of accounting and corporate scandals.

On May 31, 2005, in Arthur Andersen LLP v. United States, the Supreme Court unanimously reversed Andersen's conviction because of errors in the trial judge's jury instructions. The Supreme Court held that the instructions were too vague to allow a jury to find that obstruction of justice had occurred. The court found that the instructions were worded in such a way that Andersen could have been convicted without any proof that the firm knew it had broken the law or that there had been a link to any official proceeding that prohibited the destruction of documents. The opinion, written by Chief Justice William Rehnquist, also expressed skepticism of the government's concept of "corrupt persuasion"—persuading someone to engage in an act with an improper purpose without knowing that the act is unlawful.

Demise 
The 2005 Supreme Court ruling theoretically left Andersen free to resume operations. However, CNN reported that by then, Andersen was "nearly defunct," with about 200 employees remaining from a high of 28,000 in 2002. Following the ruling, William Mateja, a former counsel to the US Attorney General who had supervised the Andersen appeal, told NPR that he did not believe the government would seek a retrial because, "there's nothing left of Arthur Andersen, and to spend the taxpayers' money on another prosecution would be just—defy common sense." Echoing this, United States Chamber of Commerce vice president Stephen Bokat pronounced Andersen "dead," and said that "there is no putting the company back together." In his post-mortem of the Enron scandal, Conspiracy of Fools, journalist Kurt Eichenwald argued that even if Andersen had escaped the Enron scandal, it would have likely been brought down by the massive accounting fraud at WorldCom. The WorldCom fraud came to light just days after Andersen was convicted of wrongdoing at Enron.

Indeed, Andersen has never returned as a viable business on even a limited scale. Ownership of the partnership has been ceded to four limited liability companies named Omega Management I through IV.

Arthur Andersen LLP operated the Q Center conference center in St. Charles, Illinois, until day-to-day management was turned over to Dolce Hotels and Resorts in 2014, but Andersen retains ownership. In 2018, that relationship ended, and day-to-day management returned to the Q Center. The Q Center is currently used for training, primarily for internal Accenture personnel, and other large-scale companies.

In 2014, Wealth Tax and Advisory Services (WTAS), a tax and consulting firm started by several former Andersen partners, changed its name to Andersen Tax after acquiring the rights to the Andersen name. It rebranded its year-old international arm, WTAS Global, as Andersen Global. As of 2018, Andersen Global took over the andersen.com domain name from the Andersen accounting firm.

Migration of partners and local offices to new firms 
Many partners formed new companies or were acquired by other consulting firms. Examples include:

 60% of the total Andersen practices globally merged into Ernst & Young, with some going to Deloitte (notably UK, Spain and Portugal)
Accuracy which was founded in 2004 by a team of seven former partners and is headquartered in Paris
Andersen Tax which acquired the rights to the company name and changed their name from WTAS in 2014
 BearingPoint, formerly the US consulting unit spun off by KPMG, which purchased Andersen business consulting practices in France and Spain
 Huron Consulting Group
 West Monroe Partners which was founded in 2002 by four former consultants, based in Chicago
 KPMG which absorbed the computer forensics division based in Cypress, California, and the Boise, Kansas City, Philadelphia, Portland, Salt Lake City and Seattle offices, among others
 Navigant Consulting which absorbed eleven partners in Chicago and Washington D.C.
 Perot Systems which absorbed six partners
 Protiviti was formed in 2002 by hiring more than 700 professionals who had been affiliated with the internal audit, business and technology risk consulting practice of Arthur Andersen.
 SMART Business Advisory and Consulting which absorbed some of the Philadelphia office
 jcba Limited which was founded by a partner from the aviation practice
 Grant Thornton International which absorbed the North Carolina, South Carolina, Albuquerque, and Tulsa offices
 True Partners Consulting

See also 
 Accounting scandals
 Conspiracy of Fools
 Corporate abuse
 David J. Lesar
 Timeline of the Enron scandal

References

External links 
 

Accounting scandals
Consulting firms established in 1913
Financial services companies established in 1913
Financial services companies disestablished in 2002
Corporate crime
Defunct financial services companies of the United States
Enron
Defunct companies based in Chicago
Defunct accounting firms of the United States
1913 establishments in Illinois